Alexander IV may refer to:
 Pope Alexander IV (1199 or –1261)
 Alexander IV of Macedon (323 BC–309 BC), son of Alexander the Great
 Alexander IV of Imereti (died 1695), of the Bagrationi Dynasty, king of Imereti (western Georgia)